Carlos Bravo (born 25 July 1973) is a Venezuelan former fencer. He competed in the individual sabre events at the 1996 and 2008 Summer Olympics.

References

External links
 

1973 births
Living people
Venezuelan male sabre fencers
Olympic fencers of Venezuela
Fencers at the 1996 Summer Olympics
Fencers at the 2008 Summer Olympics
Sportspeople from Caracas
Fencers at the 2011 Pan American Games
Pan American Games medalists in fencing
Pan American Games silver medalists for Venezuela
Central American and Caribbean Games gold medalists for Venezuela
Central American and Caribbean Games silver medalists for Venezuela
Competitors at the 2006 Central American and Caribbean Games
Competitors at the 2010 Central American and Caribbean Games
South American Games gold medalists for Venezuela
South American Games bronze medalists for Venezuela
South American Games medalists in fencing
Competitors at the 2010 South American Games
Central American and Caribbean Games medalists in fencing
20th-century Venezuelan people
21st-century Venezuelan people